The Guwahati–Lumding section is a broad-gauge railway line connecting  and . It is under the jurisdiction of Northeast Frontier Railway zone.

History
In the pre-partition days, Assam was linked to Chittagong through the Akhaura-Kulaura-Chhatak Line and Akhaura-Laksam-Chittagong Line.  The Chittagong link had been constructed in response to the demand of the Assam tea planters for a railway link to Chittagong port. Assam Bengal Railway started construction of a railway track on the eastern side of Bengal in 1891. A  track between Chittagong and Comilla was opened to traffic in 1895. The Comilla-Akhaura-Kulaura-Badarpur section was opened in 1896–1898 and finally extended to Lumding in 1903. The Assam Bengal Railway constructed a branch line to Guwahati, connecting the city to the eastern line in 1900. During the 1900–1910 period, the Eastern Bengal Railway built the Golakganj-Amingaon branch line, thus connecting the western bank of the Brahmaputra to the western line.

Broad gauge
The railway tracks from Guwahati to Lumding and from Chaparmukh to Haibargaon were upgraded from metre gauge to  broad gauge in 1994.

Line doubling
The Guwahati-Lumding-Dibrugarh line was proposed to be doubled in the Railway Budget for 2011–12.

The Lumding Hojai patch doubling was completed on 10 July 2019.

Railway reorganisation
The Assam Railway and Trading Company Limited was merged with Assam Bengal Railway in 1945. With partition, Assam Bengal Railway was split up and railway lines in Assam became Assam Railway. In 1952, North East Railway was formed with the amalgamation of Assam Railway, Oudh-Tiirhut Railway and the Kanpur-Achnera section of Bombay, Baroda and Central India Railway. Northeast Frontier Railway was created with a part of NE Railway in 1958.

Jagiroad train derailment
On 16 April 2014, around 2:15am Guwahati bound Dimapur -Kamakhya Express derailed on the Guwahati-Lumding section near Jagiroad in central Assam's Morigaon district leading to 45 injuries. At the time of the accident, the train was carrying around 700 passengers.

References

5 ft 6 in gauge railways in India
Rail transport in Assam
Railway lines opened in 1900
Transport in Guwahati
Transport in Lumding